The 1950–51 season was the 71st season of competitive football in England.

Overview
Tottenham Hotspur won their first league title, while Newcastle United defeated Blackpool 2–0 to win their fourth FA Cup. They would win it twice more over the next four seasons. Everton were relegated to the Second Division for only the second time in their history.

The league was expanded from 88 to 92 clubs for this season, with Scunthorpe United and Shrewsbury Town joining the Third Division North, and Colchester United joining the Third Division South. Gillingham were re-elected to the Football League twelve years after being voted out and also joined the Third Division South.

Sunderland signed Trevor Ford from Aston Villa for the then record fee of £30,000 (2012: £).

At the end of the season, Matt Busby signed Birmingham City winger Johnny Berry for Manchester United for a club record fee of £25,000.

Honours

Notes = Number in parentheses is the times that club has won that honour. * indicates new record for competition

FA Cup

Newcastle United defeated Blackpool 2–0 in the 1951 FA Cup Final.

Football League

First Division
Tottenham Hotspur, in their first top-flight season since 1935, surpassed all expectations by winning the league for the first time in their history. Manchester United finished second, continuing their wait for their first title under Matt Busby. Blackpool finished third, narrowly edging out FA Cup winners Newcastle United.

A dramatic finish to the season saw all the bottom three sides bracketed together on 32 points. Everton finished bottom after being thrashed 6-0 by Sheffield Wednesday (who were already all but assured of relegation) on the last day, with Chelsea surviving thanks to a four-game winning streak.

Second Division
Preston North End won the division, with Manchester City earning promotion as runners-up, continuing the yo-yo club existence of both sides, with Preston having been out of the top-flight for two seasons, and City for one season.

Grimsby Town and Chesterfield were both relegated to the third tier.

Third Division North
Rotherham United convincingly won the division, with Mansfield Town and Carlisle United both having more-than-respectable seasons but not being able to catch Rotherham.

New Brighton, who had struggled with low attendances and financial problems since their Sandheys Park ground was destroyed by bombing in World War II, finished bottom and did not make a serious bid to be re-elected, effectively resigning their membership of the Football League. Their place was taken by Workington for the following season. Accrington Stanley retained their membership of the league as a consequence.

Third Division South
Nottingham Forest won promotion back to the Second Division at the second time of asking, with Cardiff City finishing a convincing second, but not being able to overhaul Forest.

Watford and Crystal Palace were both forced to apply for re-election, but New Brighton's plight meant neither club was in any real danger of losing their place in the Football League.

Top goalscorers

First Division
Stan Mortensen (Blackpool) – 30 goals

Second Division
Cec McCormack (Barnsley) – 33 goals

Third Division North
Jack Shaw (Rotherham United) – 37 goals

Third Division South
Wally Ardron (Nottingham Forest) – 36 goals

References